The Directors Guild of America Award for Outstanding Directorial Achievement in Daytime Serials is an annual award that was given by the Directors Guild of America between 1991 and 2012. In 2013, the category was merged into the award for Outstanding Directorial Achievement in Dramatic Series.

Winners and nominees

1990s

2000s

2010s

Programs with multiple awards
9 awards
 One Life to Live

5 awards
 General Hospital

2 awards
 The Bold and the Beautiful

Programs with multiple nominations

23 nominations
 General Hospital

20 nominations
 One Life to Live

15 nominations
 The Bold and the Beautiful
 The Young and the Restless

13 nominations
 Guiding Light

9 nominations
 All My Children

7 nominations
 Days of Our Lives

4 nominations
 As the World Turns

3 nominations
 Port Charles

Individuals with multiple awards
4 awards
 Larry Carpenter (2 consecutive)
 Jill Mitwell

3 awards
 William Ludel 

2 awards
 Scott McKinsey
 Michael Stich

Individuals with multiple nominations

9 nominations
 Larry Carpenter
 Jill Mitwell

8 nominations
 Scott McKinsey
 Michael Stich

7 nominations
 William Ludel

5 nominations
 Bruce S. Barry

4 nominations
 Joseph Behar
 Casey Childs
 Christopher Goutman
 Sally McDonald

3 nominations
 Albert Alarr
 Brian Mertes
 Mike Denney
 Owen Renfroe
 Herbert Stein
 Angela Tessinari
 Ellen Wheeler

2 nominations
 Shelley Curtis
 Susan Flannery
 Kathryn Foster
 Heather Hill
 Noel Maxam
 Conal O'Brien
 Frank Pacelli
 Cynthia J. Popp
 Susan Strickler

Total awards by network
 ABC – 15
 CBS – 5
 NBC – 2

References

External links
  (official website)

Directors Guild of America Awards